Grand Army Plaza is a square at the southeast corner of Central Park in Manhattan, New York City, at the intersection of Fifth Avenue and Central Park South (59th Street), covering two blocks on the west side of Fifth Avenue between 58th and 60th Streets. It contains an equestrian statue of William Tecumseh Sherman on its northern half and the Pulitzer Fountain on its southern half.

Grand Army Plaza was designed by Beaux-Arts architecture firm Carrère and Hastings and completed in 1916. It was renovated in 1933–1935, 1985, and 2013. The plaza has been a New York City scenic landmark since 1974.

Description

The plaza is bounded on the north by 60th Street, which contains the Scholar's Gate entrance to Central Park; on the west by Central Park and the Plaza Hotel; on the south by 58th Street, which contains the Bergdorf Goodman Building; and on the east by Fifth Avenue, which contains Apple Fifth Avenue and the General Motors Building. Grand Army Plaza is served by the Fifth Avenue–59th Street station of the New York City Subway's .

The centerpiece of the plaza's northern half (carved out of the southeastern corner of Central Park), is the equestrian statue of William Tecumseh Sherman sculpted by Augustus Saint-Gaudens, while the principal feature of the plaza's southern half is the Pulitzer Fountain, topped with a bronze statue of the Roman goddess Pomona sculpted by Karl Bitter.

History

Original design
The idea for a unified treatment of the plaza was first proposed by Karl Bitter in 1898.

The newspaper publisher Joseph Pulitzer died in 1911 having bequeathed $50,000 for the creation of a memorial fountain to be "like those in the Place de la Concorde, Paris, France." In December 1912, the executors of Pulitzer's estate announced that New York City had approved the fountain's proposed location, in the plaza between 58th and 60th Streets, just west of Fifth Avenue, the same plaza where the equestrian Sherman Monument had stood since 1903. The executors invited five architecture firms to participate in a competition to determine the fountain's design, and to provide designs for a "good architectural treatment of the whole plaza."

In January 1913, the five schemes were exhibited at the New York Public Library Main Branch, including the winning scheme, designed by Carrère and Hastings. The architect Thomas Hastings's design placed the fountain in the southern half of the plaza, whereas the Sherman Monument remained in the northern half (but moved fifteen feet west to be symmetrically opposite the fountain). Construction of the new plaza began in 1915, and by November one newspaper reported that the fountain was finished, with work on the plaza's northern portion delayed by the subway's construction.

The New York City Board of Aldermen named the space the Grand Army Plaza in 1923 after the Grand Army of the Potomac.

Renovations and landmark designation
In 1933, Herbert, Joseph and Ralph, sons of Joseph Pulitzer, donated $35,000 for the restoration of the Pulitzer Fountain, done under the supervision of architect Dan Everett Waid. The work, delayed by labor troubles, was completed by June 1935. As part of the work, the limestone basin was rebuilt in Italian marble, and the limestone balustrade and two columns surrounding the fountain were demolished. The balustrade surrounding the Sherman Monument was removed sometime later.

On July 23, 1974, the New York City Landmarks Preservation Commission (LPC) designated the Grand Army Plaza, including the Pulitzer Fountain and Sherman Monument, as a New York City scenic landmark.

On March 26, 1985, the Central Park Conservancy and the architecture firm of Buttrick White & Burtis presented plans to the LPC for a full restoration of the plaza, including the Pulitzer Fountain. The plans called for the restoration of the balustrade and columns removed in the 1935 repairs, although these were abandoned for being too expensive. The work was completed in June 1990, including a reconstruction of the fountain in granite. The restoration work included a re-gilding of the Sherman Monument.

The plaza was renewed again in 2013, including a re-gilding of the statue of William Tecumseh Sherman.

In late 2020, the New York City Department of Transportation installed sidewalk extensions along Grand Army Plaza's roadway as part of a series of traffic changes along the southeast corner of Central Park. The section of Central Park South that bisected the plaza was converted to a one-way eastbound street.

Gallery

References

External links
 

1916 establishments in New York City
59th Street (Manhattan)
Buildings and structures completed in 1916
Carrère and Hastings buildings
Central Park
Midtown Manhattan
New York City Designated Landmarks in Manhattan
New York City scenic landmarks
Squares in Manhattan
Tourist attractions in Manhattan